Compsoctena dehradunensis is a moth in the Eriocottidae family. It was described by Pathania and Rose in 2004. It is found in Uttarakhand, India.

Etymology
The species is named after Dehradun, Uttaranchal, the type locality.

References

Moths described in 2004
Compsoctena
Moths of Asia